Seejou King (born 14 April 1992) is a Danish footballer of Gambian descent who plays as a left-back for Skovshoved IF.

Early life
Seejou King was born in Hvidovre, Denmark. He played under-17 football with Hvidovre IF, before being picked up by F.C. Nordsjælland.

Senior career

F.C. Nordsjælland
At the start of the 2011-12 season, F.C. Nordsjælland were without a left full back, after selling Pierre Bengtsson to Danish Superliga champions F.C. Copenhagen in the previous winter and Bryan Oviedo's loan spell coming to an end, King was promoted to first team.

On 16 July 2011, he made his debut for Nordsjælland in a 2–0 loss to OB, the opening match of the new season, picking up his first yellow card for a foul on Andreas Johansson. Making 5 appearances for the first team in the Danish Superliga, with the arrival of Danish international Patrick Mtiliga, King had been pushed back down the pecking order.

Sporting Clube de Portugal
At the end of the 2012–2013 season January transfer window, F.C. Nordsjælland confirmed that Sporting B, the reserve-team of Sporting Clube de Portugal, had signed King on loan for the remainder of the season. King made his debut for Sporting B on 10 February 2013 in a game against Arouca. On 28 June 2013, Sporting finally decided to keep King, penning down a deal until 2016.

Career statistics

Club

References

External links 

1992 births
Living people
Danish people of Gambian descent
Danish men's footballers
Association football defenders
FC Nordsjælland players
Sporting CP B players
BK Avarta players
Akademisk Boldklub players
Skovshoved IF players
Danish Superliga players
Danish 2nd Division players
Danish expatriate men's footballers
Expatriate footballers in Portugal
Danish expatriate sportspeople in Portugal
People from Hvidovre Municipality
Sportspeople from the Capital Region of Denmark